Racquetball competitions at the 2011 Pan American Games in Guadalajara will be held from October 17 to October 25 at the Racquetball Complex. Racquetball will return to the games after being dropped from the 2007 Pan American Games.

Medal summary

Medal table

Men's events

Women's events

Schedule
All times are Central Daylight Time (UTC-5).

Qualification

There will be a maximum of 60 athletes competing in racquetball (33 males and 27 females). All countries must compete in the 2011 Pan American Racquetball championship to qualify athletes to the games, including Mexico the host nation. After the tournament is completed each nation will be given scores for each event, and the top countries will qualify athletes. Each nation can enter the pairs and teams competition, provided they have qualified at least two athletes.

References

 
Events at the 2011 Pan American Games
2011
2011 in racquetball
Racquetball in Mexico